Airness is a footwear trademark founded in 1999 in Saint-Denis (France) by Malamine Koné. The logo includes the image of a black panther.

Sponsorships
Teams and athletes using Airness equipment are:

Basketball

Previous club teams
 SLUC Nancy

Football

National teams
 (since 2013)
 Mali

Previous national teams
 Benin  (2008–2014)
 DR Congo (2006–2009)
 Congo (2006–2007)
 Gabon (2010)

Club teams

Previous club teams
 KRC Genk
 Fulham
 Auxerre
 Lille
 Nantes
 Rennes

Rugby Union
 Toronto Jazz

Tennis

Previous tennis players
 Nikolay Davydenko

References

External links
Official website

Shoe brands
Shoe companies of France
Sportswear brands
1999 establishments in France
Clothing companies of France
Sporting goods manufacturers of France
Clothing companies established in 1999
Companies based in Île-de-France